Veritone, Inc.  is an artificial intelligence tech company based in Irvine, California founded in 2014. Veritone's aiWARE technology and solutions are licensed and utilized by such industries as global media conglomerates, professional sports teams, federal government agencies, energy utilities, and state and local police departments. Veritone services more than 1,500 customers around the world. It is traded on NASDAQ Global Market as VERI.

The company’s products and services are used by its wholly owned subsidiaries: advertising agency Veritone One and Veritone Digital, which provides content management solutions and licensing services. Its proprietary operating system, aiWARE, is deployed across more than 2,000 customers, including police agencies, state and local district attorney offices, media conglomerates, radio and TV stations, and movie studios.

In addition to the company's Costa Mesa office, they have offices in San Diego, California, Denver, Colorado, Binghamton, New York, New York City, Washington, D.C., and London, England.

Chad Steelberg is Veritone’s Chairman of the Board and CEO. His brother, Ryan Steelberg, is the company's president.

History

The company was founded in 2014.

In 2017 the company acquired Atigeo Corporation. The company IPOed on May 12, 2017. Their losses were $59.6 million that year.

In 2018 the company acquired Machine Box (for $4.5 million), Wazee Digital (for $12.6 million), Performance Bridge (for $9.1 million), and S Media Limited. The company reported $27 million in revenue, with losses of $61.1 million.

In 2019 the company's advertising arm placed more than $200 million in ads for their clients, including 1-800-FLOWERS.com, Audible, DraftKings, HelloFresh, LinkedIn, SimpliSafe, and Uber. As of February 2020 the company had 277 employees. The company reported $50 million in revenue, with losses of $62.1 million.

In April 2020, the company received a $6.5 million in federally backed small business loans from Sunwest Bank as part of the Paycheck Protection Program. The company received scrutiny over this loan, which meant to protect small and private businesses. Washington Post noted the high compensation to the Steelberg brothers. 

In May 2020 Veritone announced it would return the full $6.5 million loan and issued a statement that it had "adequate financial flexibility and additional avenues to maintain our capital position."

Veritone AI uses

Media and Entertainment

Veritone Attribute and Discovery are used by radio and TV broadcasters to verify and measure the efficacy of pre-recorded ads, live-reads and organic mentions by correlating air time with activity on the advertiser's website. The products are used by such customers as iHeartMedia, the largest radio station owner in the U.S.

NotForgotten Digital Preservation Library digital time capsules use Veritone's cognitive capabilities adding automated video transcription and metadata creation to make large volumes of video content in the Time Capsules easily searchable.

Government and public safety
The company’s Veritone Redact software is used at police departments to redact personally identifiable or compromising information from video or photographic evidence. In May 2020, the U.S. Department of Justice signed a contract with Veritone to use its AI-enabled audio and video transcription and translation services. Veritone Redact is also used by government compliance provider GovQA.

Energy
In October 2020, the company announced Veritone Energy, a suite of proprietary artificial intelligence (AI) solutions focused on predicting optimal energy supply mix and pricing to meet grid demand.

References

External links
 
 Notforgotten Digital Preservation Library

Companies based in Costa Mesa, California
Companies listed on the Nasdaq
Software companies established in 2014
American companies established in 2014
Digital marketing companies of the United States